Cisano Bergamasco (Bergamasque:  or ;) is a town and comune in the province of Bergamo, Lombardy, northern Italy.

See also 

 Northern Italy

References